Ozren is a mountain in northern Bosnia and Herzegovina. It lies between cities of Doboj and Zavidovići, partly in the Federation and partly in the Republika Srpska entity.

Ozren is rich in natural resources. It abounds in drinkable water springs surrounded by clean nature, thermal wells with healing effects, ore and mineral resources. Its highest peak, Ostravica, is 918 meters high.

References

Mountains of the Federation of Bosnia and Herzegovina
Mountains of Republika Srpska
Mountains of Bosnia and Herzegovina